The 2009–10 Minnesota Golden Gophers women's hockey team represented the University of Minnesota in the 2009–10 NCAA Division I women's hockey season. The Golden Gophers were coached by Brad Frost and played their home games at Ridder Arena. The University of Minnesota hosted the 2010 NCAA Division I Women's Ice hockey Tournament's championship game on March 21, 2010 at Ridder Arena in Minneapolis. It marked the third time that Minneapolis hosted the Frozen Four. The Golden Gophers are a member of the Western Collegiate Hockey Association and attempted to win their fourth NCAA Women's Ice Hockey Championship.

Offseason
Samantha Downey (Hermantown, Minn.) and Katie Frischmann (Rochester, Minn.) will join the Golden Gopher program for the upcoming season. The two additions close out the Gopher freshman recruiting class for the 2009-2010 campaign, which also includes Megan Bozek (Buffalo Grove, Ill.), Becky Kortum (Minnetonka, Minn.), Mira Jalosuo (Lieksa, Finland) and Noora Räty (Espoo, Finland).

Downey joins the Gopher program after a successful senior year with Proctor-Hermantown-Marshall. She was an all-state honoree in 2008-09, and broke the school record with 37 goals and 74 points. She helped the Mirage to a 20-7-1 record.

Katie Frischmann, is a 5-5 defenseman, has received an acceptance of admission into the university. She played with the Minnesota Thoroughbreds for three years. In her senior year, Frischmann was a captain for a team that went 33-25-5. Along with her accomplishments on the ice, Frischmann was a four-year letterwinner in the soccer and a three-year letterwinner in lacrosse.

August 24: Three former Golden Gophers hockey players made the United States National Team roster. Natalie Darwitz, Rachael Drazan and Gigi Marvin will compete with Team USA as they prepare for the 2010 Winter Olympics. In all, 23 players were named to the team, while 21 advance as a member of the U.S. Olympic Team and a chance at a gold medal.
September 9: The WCHA announced that Golden Gophers goaltender Alyssa Grogan, defenseman Anne Schleper and forward Emily West have been named as WCHA All-Stars. The three Gophers are among 22 players from the conference to face the 2009-10 U.S Women’s National Team in St. Paul, Minn.

Regular season
October 5: The Minnesota Golden Gophers women’s hockey team was ranked No. 2 in the country. The USCHO.com officials revealed it in their first Top-10 Women’s Hockey Poll of the season. Minnesota accumulated 139 points and six first-place nods.
Tuesday, January 12: The Golden Gophers played an exhibition game against the United States women’s Olympic hockey team at Ridder Arena. The US team beat the Gophers by a score of 8-5. Team USA outshot the Golden Gophers, 56-21.
February 28: Incoming Gophers freshman, Bethany Brausen, a senior forward at Roseville Area High School, has won the 15th annual Ms. Hockey Award by Let's Play Hockey newspaper. Brausen became the third player from Roseville to be named Ms. Hockey/ The first was Winny Brodt, while the second was former Golden Gopher Ronda Curtin.

Standings

Roster

Schedule

Player stats

Skaters

Goaltenders

Postseason
February 27: After 3 hours and 47 minutes, Emily West scored at 1:16 of triple overtime to eliminate the MSU-Mankato Mavericks.

WCHA Playoffs

WCHA Final Faceoff
March 7: The Minnesota Duluth Bulldogs defeated the Minnesota Golden Gophers 3-2 at Ridder Arena in Minneapolis to win the WCHA FINAL FACE-OFF playoff championship. It is the Bulldogs fifth WCHA playoff championship. This was their first postseason victory over the Golden Gophers since 2003. In addition, the Bulldogs lost three previous league playoff games against the Gophers at Ridder Arena.

NCAA hockey tournament
March 8: Two teams from the WCHA will compete for the 10th NCAA Women's Ice Hockey Championship. The University of Minnesota will be the host school for the 2010 Frozen Four, to be held March 19 and 21 at Ridder Arena in Minneapolis. WCHA Tournament champion University of Minnesota Duluth, and at-large selection Minnesota will be two of eight competing teams. The Golden Gophers (25-8-5) are the number 3 seed, and will host the Clarkson Golden Eagles (23-11-5), on March 13 at 4:00 pm central standard time.
March 13: Emily West scored the game-winning goal in overtime as the Golden Gophers defeated Clarkson and earned a trip to the Frozen Four. The final score was 3-2 in overtime.

Awards and honors
Kelli Blankenship, 2010 Frozen Four Skills Competition participant
Chelsey Jones, WCHA Offensive Player of the Week (Week of October 5)
Sarah Erickson, WCHA Offensive Player of the Week (Week of October 12)
Sarah Erickson, Minnesota, WCHA Player of the Week (Week of January 11)
Noora Räty, WCHA Defensive Player of the Week (Week of October 19)
Noora Räty, WCHA Rookie of the Week (Week of October 26)
Noora Räty, WCHA Co-Defensive Player of the Week (Week of December 7)
Noora Raty, WCHA Defensive Player of the Week (Week of January 25)
Noora Räty, Patty Kazmaier Award nominee
Noora Raty, WCHA Goaltending Champion
Anne Schleper, Patty Kazmaier Award nominee
Anne Schleper, WCHA Defensive Player of the Year
Emily West, Patty Kazmaier Award nominee

All-WCHA Team
Noora Raty, G, All-WCHA First Team
Anne Schleper, D, All-WCHA First Team
Emily West, F, All-WCHA First Team
Noora Raty, WCHA All-Rookie Team

All-America selections
 Noora Raty, 2010 Women's RBK Hockey Division I All-America First Team
 Anne Schleper, 2010 Women's RBK Hockey Division I All-America First Team

Postseason
April 26: Golden Goldy Award (an award gala held each year to celebrate the University's athletic achievements)
Noora Raty earned a Golden Goldy Award as the University’s Female Rookie of the Year
 Anne Schleper also earned a Golden Goldy Award. She was honored as the Female Breakthrough Athlete

See also
2009–10 WCHA women's ice hockey season
2009–10 NCAA Division I women's ice hockey season
2009–10 Minnesota Golden Gophers women's basketball team

References

External links
Official site

Minnesota Golden Gophers women's ice hockey seasons
Minnesota
NCAA women's ice hockey Frozen Four seasons
Minn
Minne
Minne